Redzikowo-Osiedle  is a village in the administrative district of Gmina Słupsk, within Słupsk County, Pomeranian Voivodeship, in northern Poland.

The village has a population of 1,246.

History

References

Redzikowo-Osiedle